The Covit House is a historic house on Goshen Center Road in Goshen, New Hampshire.  Built about 1800, it is one of the oldest surviving and best-preserved plank-frame houses in the town.  The house was listed on the National Register of Historic Places in 1985.

Description and history
It is a -story wooden structure, with a clapboarded exterior, gabled roof and brick central chimney. It is oriented facing west, just west of the fish pond. The main facade is five bays wide, with pairs of sash windows flanking the main entry. The entry is simply framed, with a four-light transom window above the door.

The house is one of a significant cluster of 19th-century plank-framed houses  and is one of the oldest and best-preserved in the town.  It was built about 1800, and was reported to be in excellent condition at the time it was listed on the National Register in 1985.

See also
National Register of Historic Places listings in Sullivan County, New Hampshire

References

Houses on the National Register of Historic Places in New Hampshire
Houses completed in 1800
Houses in Goshen, New Hampshire
National Register of Historic Places in Sullivan County, New Hampshire